Melicope confusa is a tree in the family Rutaceae.

Description
The bark is used medicinally in Taiwan and the Philippines.

Distribution and habitat
Melicope confusa grows naturally in Borneo, the Philippines, Sulawesi and the Maluku Islands. In Malaysian Borneo's Sabah state, its habitat is forests from sea-level to  altitude.

References

confusa
Trees of Borneo
Trees of the Philippines
Trees of Sulawesi
Trees of the Maluku Islands
Plants described in 1922